Blind is a 2021 sculptural work by the Italian multi-media artist Maurizio Cattelan (B. 1960), memorializing the events of September 11, 2001, created twenty years hence. 

Cattelan was in New York City on 911 and had to walk home from LaGuardia Airport. The piece premiered at the Pirelli HangarBicocca in Milan in the exhibition "Breath Ghosts Blind" curated by Vicente Todolí and Roberta Tenconi. It has been reported that the artist first wished to show it at the Solomon R. Guggenheim Museum in New York City but that the museum's then chief curator, Nancy Spector had been "hesitant at best"  ...[at such a prospect].

The sculpture consists of a black resum monolith representing one of the New York City's old World Trade Center's towers intersected by the silhouette of a jetliner.

References

2021 sculptures
September 11 attacks
Italian sculpture